"A Little Time" is a song by English pop rock group the Beautiful South, the first single to be released from their second album, Choke. It consists of a duet featuring vocalists Dave Hemingway and Briana Corrigan. Produced by Mike Hedges, "A Little Time" is the band's only single to reach number one on the UK Singles Chart, and it peaked inside the top 20 in Austria, Belgium, Ireland, and the Netherlands.

Lyrical content
The Beautiful South have given different interpretations about the song's meaning. Songwriter Paul Heaton stated that "A Little Time" is about relationships in general while co-writer David Rotheray considers it an unconventional love song. Briana Corrigan explained that the song encapsulates an everyday situation, as love is not always a good thing and can lead to conflict.

Critical reception
Upon its release, Nick Duerden, writing for Record Mirror, described the song as "a sloping country lilt that unfolds so gracefully and quietly that it is truly touching" and added that the band's "sardonic humour is present as ever". Nick Robinson of Music Week praised it as a "beautiful ballad" and "a tale of a crumbling relationship softly sung over a light rhythm complete with strings and piano".

Awards
The video won the 1991 Brit Awards for British Video of the Year, directed by photographer Nick Brandt, which is their only Brit Award to date. It features a fighting couple (played by Hemingway and Corrigan), a trashed house, a load of flour and feathers, and a teddy bear's head impaled on the end of a kitchen knife.

Track listings
7-inch single and Australasian CD single
 "A Little Time"
 "In Other Words I Hate You"

UK and European CD single
 "A Little Time"
 "In Other Words I Hate You"
 "What You See Is What You Get"

Charts and certifications

Weekly charts

Year-end charts

Certifications

References

1990 singles
1990 songs
The Beautiful South songs
Go! Discs singles
Music videos directed by Nick Brandt
Song recordings produced by Mike Hedges
Songs written by David Rotheray
Songs written by Paul Heaton
UK Singles Chart number-one singles